Rebecca Suzanne Whisnant is professor and chair of the philosophy department at the University of Dayton.

Biography 
Whisnant gained her degree in philosophy from Oberlin College in 1989. She went on to complete a masters (1992), and a Ph.D. (2002), both in philosophy, at University of North Carolina at Chapel Hill.

Prior to working at the University of Dayton, Whisnant taught at the University of Southern Indiana.

Bibliography

Books 
 
 
  Quote from book: "One of the key points we wanted to get across in the book is that pornography is prostitution."
Book review:

Chapters in books 

 
  (With Karen Boyle.)

Journal articles 
 
 
  Pdf.
  Pdf.
 

Book review
 
Book details:

See also 
 University of Dayton Discussion: Rebecca Whisnant class Chat with readers of "Why is Beauty On Parade" (archived at Archive.org)

References

External links 
 Profile Page: Rebecca Whisnant University of Dayton

American women academics
American feminist writers
American mass media scholars
American social activists
Anti-pornography feminists
Anti-prostitution feminists
Feminist philosophers
Gender studies academics
Living people
Mass media theorists
Place of birth missing (living people)
Oberlin College alumni
University of Dayton faculty
University of North Carolina at Chapel Hill alumni
University of Southern Indiana faculty
Year of birth missing (living people)